Biko Bradnock-Brennan (born 4 October 1992) is an Irish-English footballer who last played for National League South side Whitehawk.

Career

Bradnock-Brennan played for Fulham FC under 16's. Bradnock-Brennan captained Blackpool youth side and played with their reserves. Bradnock-Brennan was released in 2011, moving to Harrow Borough. After a season with Harrow Borough, Bradnock-Brennan accepted a college soccer scholarship at the University of North Carolina at Charlotte in 2012. Whilst at Charlotte University was ranked 69 nationally by Top Draw Soccer in his Junior Year. Bradnock-Brennan earned National Honours Team of the Week and named one of the Top 10 defenders in college in the same year.

Bradnock-Brennan went undrafted in the 2016 MLS SuperDraft, later signing with United Soccer League side San Antonio FC.

After a short spell in Norway, Bradnock-Brennan signed for Brighton-based National League South side Whitehawk in November 2017 before leaving the next month.

References

Republic of Ireland association footballers
Association football defenders
USL Championship players
1992 births
Living people
Charlotte 49ers men's soccer players
Blackpool F.C. players
Harrow Borough F.C. players
San Antonio FC players
Whitehawk F.C. players
Sportspeople from Cork (city)